Joël Kimwaki Mpela (born 14 October 1986) is a Congolese professional footballer who plays as a centre-back for FC Renaissance du Congo. He made 52 appearances for the DR Congo national team scoring 3 goals.

Club career
Kimwaki played for TP Mazembe in the 2010 FIFA Club World Cup, where they reached the final losing 3–0 to Inter Milan.

In November 2019, FC Renaissance du Congo announced the signing of Kimwaki from TP Mazembe one a one-season contract.

International career
In 2015 he was selected for the DR Congo national team's 2015 Africa Cup of Nations squad.

International goals
Scores and results list DR Congo's goal tally first, score column indicates score after each Kimwaki goal.

Honors
DR Congo
Africa Cup of Nations bronze: 2015

References

External links
FIFA Profile

Living people
1986 births
Footballers from Kinshasa
Association football central defenders
Democratic Republic of the Congo footballers
Democratic Republic of the Congo international footballers
Linafoot players
Daring Club Motema Pembe players
TP Mazembe players
FC Renaissance du Congo players
2011 African Nations Championship players
2015 Africa Cup of Nations players
21st-century Democratic Republic of the Congo people
2009 African Nations Championship players
Democratic Republic of the Congo A' international footballers
2016 African Nations Championship players